Bokermannohyla caramaschii is a species of frogs in the family Hylidae.

It is endemic to Brazil.
Its natural habitats are subtropical or tropical moist lowland forests and rivers.
It is threatened by habitat loss.

References

Bokermannohyla
Endemic fauna of Brazil
Frogs of South America
Amphibians described in 2005
Taxonomy articles created by Polbot